George Sutherland Smith (1830 – 18 August 1903) was a Scotsman who migrated to Australia, a builder and paddle-steamer captain who turned to winemaking, with considerable success, founding the All Saints winery in the Rutherglen region of Victoria.

History

George S. Smith was born in Caithness, Scotland in 1830 (some sources have 1828), and with John Banks (1833–1876) trained as construction engineer apprenticed as a joiner to Banks's father. They emigrated to Australia at the time of the gold rush, arriving in Victoria in 1852. They were partners in a gold claim in Beechworth, Victoria.

Builder and contractor

They formed a partnership "Smith & Banks", builders and contractors of Wangaratta and Beechworth in 1857, engaging in a number of public contracts such as the bridge over the Edward River at Deniliquin, extensions to Beechworth prison, and built the hospital and Presbyterian church in Beechworth.

In 1872 they purchased a sawmill at Barnawatha to supply sleepers for the rapidly advancing railway. The sawmill was destroyed by fire in 1875.

Riverboats

He was a partner in Smith & Harris (1863–1866) then Smith & Banks (1865); they acted as a local agent for Murray & Jackson, two Americans who ran the stern-wheel paddle-steamers Settler, Lady Daly and Lady Darling, in which he had a financial interest. Smith & Banks then built their own steamer, the Teviot at Wahgunyah in 1865, and around the same time took over the Lady Darling. They then purchased the Beechworth; she was destroyed by fire at the Echuca wharf in January 1867; they rebuilt her as the Jane Eliza. Smith and Banks's store in Wahgunyah was swept away in the floods in October 1867. They sold Teviot in 1868 and built new sheds and wharves, founded the Upper Murray Navigation Line with the admission of John Foord and his Waradgery, to run between Albury and Echuca. George was owner of Lady Darling when it was destroyed by fire in 1871. They skippered Jane Eliza themselves until around 1872, when they chartered her to George Dorward, then in 1875 sold her to Heseltine & Reid and got out of the business. They had timed it well: within ten years river traffic had passed its peak; there were more boats on the Murray than ever, and newly constructed roads and railways were eating into their traffic, subsidised by States that were jealous of each other's share of the trade.

Winemaking

The partners had vines under irrigation on the banks of the Murray at Wahgunya in 1864, but met with little success. In 1866 they purchased land at nearby Rutherglen, and developed it into All Saints Vineyard, named for a parish in Caithness. Banks's involvement dropped away in the 1870s, and he died young, in 1876 (there appears to have been no newspaper coverage, or even mention in the Family Notices columns, of this event. His wife, Isabella, née Martin died in 1895).  Smith's wines were highly successful almost immediately, winning many local and international awards between 1873 and 1883. By 1888 the estate covered 100 acres and boasted a grand castellated cellar building, said to be modelled on the Castle of Mey near Caithness.  He was a member of the Rutherglen Vine Growers' Association and its first President, and also served as President of the Rutherglen Shire Council. His sons took over operations and expanded it considerably. At the time of his death All Saints was one of the largest wineries in Victoria, covering 500 acres.

He died of heart failure at his residence "Kia Ora", St. Kilda Road, Melbourne on 18 August 1903. His estate was valued at £31,400.

His grandsons and great-grandsons continued operation of the winery, which after some variable fortunes passed in the 1980s into the hands of a syndicate led by Mike Fallon; after his death it was acquired by Brown Brothers in 1992, and is now owned by the children of Peter R. Brown.

Family
He married (1) John Banks's sister Elizabeth Banks (ca.1835 – 27 August 1871) in Scotland around 1860 and (2) Sarah Maria Parsons Runting on 9 July 1873 at Wahgunyah, Victoria. Their children were:
Joseph Smith (ca.1863 – ca.24 April 1913)
David Banks Smith (ca.1864 – 4 September 1937)
George John Banks Smith (ca.1870 – 16 December 1932)
James William Runting Smith (1873 – 24 August 1924).
Jennie Eliza (1866 - 1927), who married Arthur Boyer Brown, of the Commercial Bank, on 21 April 1892, lived at "Wyvenhoe", Middle Brighton, Victoria. A son, also named Arthur Boyer Brown (born ca. 1896), fought in World War I and was awarded the MM

See also
Murray-Darling steamboats
Murray-Darling steamboat people

References

External links 
All Saints Estate website
University of Melbourne archives

People from Caithness
Australian riverboat captains
Australian winemakers
1830 births
1903 deaths
Scottish emigrants to colonial Australia
19th-century Australian businesspeople
People from Beechworth